Jasmine Sim is a Singaporean actress and model.

Early life
Sim was born on 22 November 1993 in Singapore. She attended Victoria Junior College before graduating from the Singapore Management University.

Career
Sim started modelling in 2014 for a local fashion brand, Love, Bonito's store online and was first runner up in New Paper New Face. In 2017, Sim made her acting debut in her first dramas, appearing in Dream Coder, The Lead and When Duty Calls in supporting roles.

Sim starred in a short film titled Down The Rabbit Hole, which was created by the Central Narcotics Bureau (CNB) to remind young people of the hazards of drug abuse.

Filmography

Television

Accolades

References

External links
 

Living people
Singaporean people of Chinese descent
Singaporean film actresses
Singaporean television actresses
Singaporean television personalities
21st-century Singaporean actresses
Victoria Junior College alumni
1993 births